The Serbian film industry produced over twenty feature films in 2014. This article fully lists all non-pornographic films, including short films, that had a release date in that year and which were at least partly made by Serbia. It does not include films first released in previous years that had release dates in 2014. It does, however, include films produced by Kosovo (whose sovereignty is disputed), which are also included in List of Kosovan films of 2014.  Also included is an overview of the major events in Serbian film, including film festivals and awards ceremonies, as well as lists of those films that have been particularly well received, both critically and financially.

Major releases

Minor releases

See also 
 2014 in film
 2014 in Serbia
 Cinema of Serbia
 Serbian submissions for the Academy Award - Best Foreign Language Film Category

References

External links

Serbian
Films
2014